My Better Self is the sixth album by singer/songwriter Dar Williams. It was released on September 13, 2005, by Razor & Tie.

Track listing
All songs written by Dar Williams, except where noted.
"Teen for God" – 3:28
"I'll Miss You Till I Meet You" – 4:27
"Echoes" (Jules Shear, Rob Hyman, Stewart Lerman) – 3:59
"Blue Light of the Flame" (Williams, Hyman) – 3:05
"Everybody Knows This Is Nowhere" (Neil Young) – 4:28
"Two Sides of the River" – 4:09
"Empire" – 3:47
"Comfortably Numb" (Roger Waters, David Gilmour) – 5:26
"So Close to My Heart" – 3:11
"Beautiful Enemy" – 3:10
"Liar" – 2:58
"You Rise and Meet the Day" – 3:06
"The Hudson" – 4:38

The album was released with different bonus tracks depending on the vendor. Copies bought at Borders bookstores included a live recording of "And a God Descended" and Barnes & Noble customers got a live rendition of "I Saw a Bird Fly Away".

Personnel
Dar Williams – guitar, vocals
Sammy Merendino – percussion
Steuart Smith – organ, acoustic guitar, piano, keyboards, guitar
Michael Visceglia – bass, bass pedals
Julie Wolf – organ, melodica, vox organ, Fender Rhodes, Mellotron, piano, accordion, glockenspiel, clavinet
Neal Evans – organ, bass guitar, piano
Alan Evans – drums
Eric Krasno – guitar
Ben Butler – guitar
Ani DiFranco – guitar, vocals
Eric Bazilian – vocals
Steve Holley – drums, glockenspiel
Rob Hyman – organ, Cordovox, piano, Wurlitzer
Stewart Lerman – guitar, keyboards, production
Patty Larkin – vocals
Marshall Crenshaw – guitar, vocals, backing vocals

External links

Fan site with clips
Download of "Echoes"
Listen to My Better Self

2005 albums
Dar Williams albums
Razor & Tie albums
Albums produced by Stewart Lerman